"Love's on My Mind" is a song recorded by Australian group Girlfriend. The song was released in March 1993 as the fifth and final single from their debut studio album Make It Come True. The song peaked at number 65 on the ARIA singles chart in April 1993, and spent seven weeks in the top 100.

Track listing

Charts

References

1992 songs
1993 singles
Bertelsmann Music Group singles
Girlfriend (band) songs